"Honky Tonk Moon" is a song written by Dennis O'Rourke, and recorded by American country music artist Randy Travis.  It was released in June 1988 as the lead off single from his album Old 8x10.  It became his seventh and fifth consecutive number 1 hit in the United States.  It peaked at number 1 on the Billboard Hot Country Singles & Tracks chart.

Content
The B-side of the 7" vinyl single, "Young Guns", co-written by Randy Travis, has not been released on any of his albums.

Chart performance
"Honky Tonk Moon" spent one week beginning October 8, 1988 at the top of The Billboard Hot Country Songs chart.

Weekly charts

Year-end charts

References

1988 singles
1988 songs
Randy Travis songs
Song recordings produced by Kyle Lehning
Warner Records singles